San Fabián de Alico is a town in San Fabián, Ñuble Region.

See also
 List of towns in Chile

Populated places in Punilla Province